Le Relais Bernard Loiseau, formerly La Côte d'Or, is a Michelin Guide two-star French restaurant located in Saulieu, France. The restaurant was bought by Claude Verger in 1975, and Bernard Loiseau was installed as the chef de cuisine. The Michelin Guide bestowed a coveted 3-star in 1991, largely due to the fanatic attention to detail, frenetic work ethic and discerning palate of Loiseau. After the Gault Millau guide downgraded the restaurant from 19/20 to 17/20, there were also rumors in Le Figaro that the Michelin Guide  was planning to remove one of La Côte d'Or's three stars. Loiseau committed suicide. La Côte d'Or is now run by executive chef Patrick Bertron, after having lost its coveted third star.

References

French cuisine
Michelin Guide starred restaurants in France
Côte-d'Or